Somervell may refer to:

People
 Alexander Somervell (1796-1854), Texan soldier who led the Somervell Expedition into Mexico
 Arthur Somervell (1863–1937), British composer
 Brehon B. Somervell (1892–1955), American general
 D. C. Somervell (1885–1965), British historian
 Donald Somervell, Baron Somervell of Harrow (1889–1960), British judge and Conservative politician
 Howard Somervell (1890–1975), British explorer
 James Somervell (1825-1924), British Conservative politician
 William Somervell (1860–1934), British Liberal politician

Places
 Somervell County, Texas

Other
 USAV General Brehon B. Somervell, a logistics support vessel in the United States Army

See also
 Somerville (disambiguation)
 Summerville (disambiguation)